The People Against O'Hara is a 1951 American crime film noir directed by John Sturges and based on Eleazar Lipsky's novel.  The film features Spencer Tracy, Pat O'Brien, John Hodiak, and James Arness.

Plot
James Curtayne (Tracy) was once a highly successful prosecutor as a New York City district attorney, driven from his job and the high pressure field of criminal law by the bottle. After a long "vacation" he’s attempted to settle into less demanding civil law to make it to an overdue but now financially postponed retirement. Johnny O'Hara (Arness), a boy from the old neighborhood, is accused of a murder.  His parents head straight for Curtayne. Unable to pay they nonetheless beg "the counselor" to take the case.  He accepts - knowing it will be a tough go, both personally and professionally. 
 
Johnny's boss, Bill Sheffield, was shot and robbed during the night on the stairs of his home by two people in an older coupe. The murder is seen from a distance by a man coming out of a saloon. Police trace the car to Johnny. When detectives come to question him, Johnny flees, claiming he believed they were thugs after him. During his questioning, Detective Ricks (O'Brien) and District Attorney Barra (Hodiak), reveals the murder weapon also to have been his. Johnny claims both were stolen. A young punk, Pete Korvac (Campbell), is brought in.  He claims he was the driver, and fingers Johnny as the trigger man.

Johnny admits he’d had a beef that day with Sheffield over some overtime pay but insists he was working all night. The night watchman refutes it. Instead, Johnny had been breaking up with his lover, Katrina (Duguay), the young wife of a tough mobster who controls the waterfront, "Knuckles" Lanzetti (Ciannelli).  Knowing what would happen to Katrina if he reveals the truth, Johnny lies to both the D.A. and his own attorney.

Curtayne, a widower, is cared for by his doting but over-protective daughter, Ginny (Lynn).  She has put her own future with fiance Jeff (Anderson) on hold for two years keeping her father on the wagon. Professing confidence he can handle the strain, Curtayne is forced to do his own leg work.  He visits the Korvac family, who stonewall him, loudly proclaiming they have no use for the slippery Pete. Curtayne visits Knuckles, suspicious of his involvement but willing to horse-trade information upon accepting Knuckles' denials...yet unwilling to accept the mobster's offer to pull strings on his behalf.

At trial Johnny's alibi about being at work all night is shattered. Pete's chatty double-talk is convincing and Curtayne proves unable to rattle him. The counselor confides in Ricks, his old friend, that his mind is failing him, the toll of age, drink, the stakes, and a competent younger adversary he cannot better. Desperate, he turns a sip of a "short beer" into shots of straight rye.  Approached in the bar by the eyewitness, a Norwegian seaman, Sven Norson (Flippen), with an offer to change his story, Curtayne caves to his demons and writes out a $500 personal check.

D.A. Barra discovers the bribe, reveals it to Curtayne, but holds it sub rosa. He still easily wins the case, leaving Johnny facing the electric chair and Curtayne disbarment.  Sensing a frame, Ricks tips his old friend off about Johnny's involvement with Katrina, a relationship that began on the docks before World War II, before Johnny shipped out to the Pacific for the duration and she married Knuckles.  Curtayne confronts her.  Grief-stricken, she tells the truth in front of the D.A., willing to accept the consequences in hopes of saving her love. Johnny continues to deny being with her, but the men see through it. Knuckles remains clueless.

Upon discovering Johnny had been set up, Curtayne, Ricks, and Barra revisit the crime, trying to tease out a motive.  A tale planted by Pete about a "gold bar" the victim was carrying in an empty suitcase found in Johnny’s car again fails scrutiny; instead, lab tests reveal the battered old bag had actually been impregnated with $200,000 worth the narcotics destined for the "Chicago mob".  They devise a scheme to plant a lookalike in the home and entrap whoever comes to steal it.  Knuckles, who again professes a debt to Curtayne for not sending him to prison - or worse - when Curtayne had the chance before he dissolved in drink, agrees to spread the word about the suitcase's planned return that night around town.

Curtayne, wired for sound, volunteers to be the pigeon to deliver it and lie in wait for whoever was behind the original killing.  It turns out to be the eldest Korvac brother, who tells him Knuckles is dead, abducts Curtayne, and marches him suitcase in hand towards the river and certain death.

Barra orders a police dragnet to close in on the area, but it proves too late.  Even a last-ditch effort of a police woman who volunteers to intercept the pair fails in a hail of gunfire, with Curtayne felled point-blank by Korvacs.  Moved by Curtayne's heroism, Barra tells Ricks he'll have to find someone else to press the bribery indictment against the wounded man, as he won't.  Before Ricks can respond the ambulance medic interrupts to tell them he hopes it wasn’t anything important because Curtayne is dead.

Cast
 Spencer Tracy as James Curtayne
 Pat O'Brien as Det. Vincent Ricks
 Diana Lynn as Ginny 
 John Hodiak as D.A. Louis Barra
 James Arness as Johnny O'Hara
 Eduardo Ciannelli as Knuckles Lanzetta
 William Campbell as Pete Korvac
 Yvette Duguay as Katrina
 Jay C. Flippen as Sven Norson
 Richard Anderson as Jeff Chapman
 Charles Bronson as Angelo Korvac

Reception
According to MGM records the film earned $1,107,000 in the US and Canada and $588,000 elsewhere, resulting in a $22,000 profit.

Critical response
Bosley Crowther of The New York Times called the film "a curiously old-fashioned courtroom drama" that "moved ploddingly".  A Variety reviewer wrote, "A basically good idea for a film melodrama [from a novel by Eleazar Lipsky] is cluttered up with too many unnecessary side twists and turns, and the presentation is uncomfortably overlong."

Radio adaptation
The People Against O'Hara was presented on Lux Radio Theatre March 9, 1953. The one-hour adaptation starred Walter Pidgeon.

References

External links
 
 
 
 

1951 films
1950s legal films
1950s crime thriller films
American black-and-white films
American courtroom films
American legal films
American crime thriller films
Film noir
Films based on American novels
Films directed by John Sturges
Films scored by Carmen Dragon
Films set in New York City
Films shot in New York City
Metro-Goldwyn-Mayer films
1950s English-language films
1950s American films